Md Elias Kobra (born 20 January 1961) is a Bangladeshi film actor. In the films he usually plays the supporting negative role. He made his acting debut in the 1987 film Maruk Shah directed by Masood Parvez (Sohel Rana). In a career spanning more than two decades, Elias Cobra has acted in more than 500 films.

Personal life 
Elias Cobra was born on January 20, 1961, in Baharchhara, Teknaf.

Career 
Elias Cobra made his acting debut in Masood Parvez's (Sohel Rana) film Maruk Shah in 1986. Danny Sidak also played a villain with him at the time. Before coming to the movies, Elias Cobra ran a martial arts school. He has mostly worked in martial arts movies. He came from Burma to learn martial arts. He has acted in many films as a worthy rival to the kung fu hero RubelSo far he has acted in more than five hundred movies and Ratan Talukder.

Elias Cobra won the 2000 Shilpi Samiti election for the post of Sports-Cultural Secretary.

Selected movies 
 Maruk Shah (1996)
 Shant Ken Mastan (1997)
 Bhand (1997)
 Mugher Mulluk (1999)
 Lund Bhand (2000)
 Chairman (2001)
 Major Saheb (2002)
 City Terror (2005)
 Bullet (2006)
 Priya Amar Priya (2007)
 Thekao Andolan (2009)
 Hai Prem Hai Bhalobasha (2010)
 Search - The Search (2010)
 Wanted (2011)
 Boss Number One (2011)
 Dui Prithibi (2015)
 Musafir (2016)

Criticism 
He has been criticized for acting in several obscene movies

References

External links 
 
 

Bangladeshi film producers
People from Cox's Bazar District
21st-century Bangladeshi male actors
Bangladeshi male film actors
Living people
1961 births